The Counterfeit Bridegroom; Or, The Defeated Widow is a 1677 comedy play. The work's authorship is usually credited to Aphra Behn has been alternatively been attributed to Thomas Betterton. It was inspired by Thomas Middleton's Jacobean play No Wit, No Help Like a Woman's.

It was originally performed by the Duke's Company at the Dorset Garden Theatre in London. The cast included Anthony Leigh as Sir Oliver Santloe, John Bowman as Peter Santloe, Thomas Gillow as Sanders, John Crosby as Noble, Joseph Williams as Hadland, Thomas Percival as Sir Gregory Lovemuch, Henry Norris as Gazer, John Richards as  Sam, Anne Shadwell as  Clarina, Margaret Osborne as Widow Laudwell and Elizabeth Currer as Mrs Hadland.

References

Bibliography
 Canfield, J. Douglas. Tricksters and Estates: On the Ideology of Restoration Comedy. University Press of Kentucky, 2014.
 Nicoll, Allardyce. History of English Drama, 1660-1900: Volume 1, Restoration Drama, 1660-1700. Cambridge University Press, 1952.
 Roberts, David. Thomas Betterton: The Greatest Actor of the Restoration Stage. Cambridge University Press,  2010.
 Van Lennep, W. The London Stage, 1660-1800: Volume One, 1660-1700. Southern Illinois University Press, 1960.

1677 plays
West End plays
Restoration comedy
Plays by Aphra Behn